It's a Dying World is a Christian rock album by Steve Camp and was released by Myrrh Records in 1984. This was Camp's final album for Myrrh Records, but was not released until after Camp released Fire and Ice with Sparrow in late 1983.

Track listing 

All songs written by Steve Camp, except where noted.

"Holding on to You" (Camp, Rob Frazier) - 3:43
"Don't Wanna Be Friends" - 3:18
"It's a Dying World" - 3:49
"You Comfort Me" (Dana Key, Eddie DeGarmo, Mylon LeFevre) - 3:20
"You Know What's Right" (Carol Frazier, R. Frazier, Camp) – 3:19
"Light Your Candle" - 3:19
"I Don't Live by Chance" - 3:25
"Tongue is a Fire" - 5:04
"Can You Sleep Tonight" - 3:53
"Man Does Not Live" - 3:27

 A version of "Light Your Candle" was also released on Camp's 1983 album, Fire and Ice. This album was recorded before Fire and Ice, but released after. The version used here is the original, as Camp added the line "Let it burn bright in the face of the devil" in the chorus for Fire and Ice.

Personnel 
 Steve Camp – lead and backing vocals, acoustic guitars, arrangements
 Norman Barratt – electric guitars, arrangements
 Dave Morris – keyboards, acoustic piano, arrangements
  Larry Tomaso – bass, arrangements
  Russell Caldwell – drums, arrangements
 Joan Anderson – backing vocals
 Diane Thiel – backing vocals

Production
 Steve Camp – producer
 Steven C. Wyer – executive producer
 Hank Neuberger – engineer at Chapel Lane Studios, Hereford, UK
 Steve Camp – mixing
 Hank Neuberger – mixing at Chicago Recording Company, Chicago, Illinois
 Dlorah L. Abdi – art direction
 Camille Brown – design and design concept
 Steve G.S. Morgan – cover background and sleeve photography
 Phillip Radcliffe – cover people photography

References 

1984 albums
Steve Camp albums
Myrrh Records albums